The Juno Award for "Classical Composition of the Year" has been awarded since 1987, as recognition each year for the best classical music composition in Canada.

Winners

Best Classical Composition (1987–2002)

Classical Composition of the Year (2003 – Present)

References 

Classical Composition
Classical music awards